The 2005–06 season saw Dundee compete in the Scottish First Division after being relegated the season prior. Dundee finished in 7th position with 43 points, the lowest position the club has ever finished in. The club made it to the semi-finals of the Scottish Cup, before falling to Second Division side Gretna.

Final league table

Results 
Dundee's score comes first

Legend

Scottish First Division

Scottish Cup

Scottish League Cup

Scottish Challenge Cup

References

External links 

 Dundee 2005–06 at Soccerbase.com (select relevant season from dropdown list)

Dundee F.C. seasons
Dundee